Wang Wei is the name of:

Historical figures 
 Wang Wei (Liang dynasty) (died 552), official under the Liang dynasty rebel Hou Jing
 Wang Wei (Tang dynasty) (699–759), Tang dynasty poet, musician, painter, and statesman
 Wang Wei (courtesan) (1597–1647), late-Ming dynasty courtesan and minor poet

Entrepreneurs
 Wang Wei (SF Express) (born 1971), founder of SF Express
 Gary Wang or Wang Wei (born 1973), founder of Tudou.com
 William Wang or Wang Wei, founder of Vizio

Sportspeople 
 Wang Wei (fencer) (born 1958), Chinese fencer
 Wei Wang (table tennis) (born 1961), Chinese-born American table tennis player
 Wang Wei (ice hockey) (born 1977), Chinese ice hockey player
 Wang Wei (baseball) (born 1978), Chinese baseball player
 Wang Wei (badminton) (born 1979), Chinese badminton player
 Wang Wei (sailor) (born 1988), Chinese Olympic sailor
 Wang Wei (footballer) (born 1989), Chinese footballer
 Wang Wei (high jumper), high jumper who competed in the 1993 East Asian Games
 Wang Wei (swimmer), swimmer and World Swimming Championships medalist

Others
 Wang Wei (1937–2023), Chinese physicist
 Wang Wei (PRC politician) (born 1960), former official in the Central Commission for Discipline Inspection
  (1968–2001), Chinese air force pilot who died in the Hainan Island incident
 Wei Zi (born 1956), real name Wang Wei, Chinese actor
 Wei Wang (computer scientist), professor at the University of California, Los Angeles

See also
Wang Jingwei regime, also known as the Wang Wei regime
Wei Wang (disambiguation) — a list of people with this royal title